I Corps (First Corps) was the designation of three different corps-sized units in the Union Army during the American Civil War. Separate formation called the I Corps served in the Army of the Ohio/Army of the Cumberland under Alexander M. McCook from September 29, 1862 to November 5, 1862, in the Army of the Mississippi under George W. Morgan from January 4, 1863 to January 12, 1863 (which was the re-designated XIII Corps (ACW)), and in the Army of the Potomac and Army of Virginia (see below). The first two were units of very limited life; the third was one of the most distinguished and veteran corps in the entire Union Army, commanded by very distinguished officers.  The term "First Corps" is also used to describe the First Veteran Corps from 1864 to 1866.

History

The I Corps was created on March 3, 1862, when President Abraham Lincoln ordered the creation of a five-corps army, then under the command of Major General George B. McClellan. The first commander of the corps was Major General Irvin McDowell. It contained three divisions under the commands of Brigadier Generals William B. Franklin, George A. McCall, and Rufus King.

McClellan originally intended for the I Corps to participate in his Peninsula Campaign with the rest of the army, but after Stonewall Jackson initiated his Valley Campaign on March 23 at the First Battle of Kernstown, President Lincoln decided to keep the corps in northern Virginia to protect Washington.

On April 4, Lincoln created the Department of the Rappahannock, detaching the I Corps from the Army of the Potomac to form the core of the new department, and giving command of the department to I Corps commander, Irvin McDowell.

In May, Franklin’s division was detached and sent south to reinforce McClellan in his Peninsula campaign, uniting with a division of the IV Corps to form the VI Corps.

On June 18, McCall’s division, the “Pennsylvania Reserves”, was also detached and sent to join McClellan’s army on the Virginia Peninsula. Temporarily attached to the V Corps, it saw heavy action at Gaines' Mill and Glendale. Division commander Brig. Gen. George McCall and future I Corps commander Brig. Gen. John Reynolds were both captured and freed in a prisoner exchange that August.

On June 26, Rufus King’s division, James B. Ricketts’ division, and Abner Doubleday’s brigade were transferred from the Department of the Rappahannock to the newly created Army of Virginia, forming its III Corps, under the command of Irvin McDowell.

On August 26, the “Pennsylvania Reserves” were transferred to the III Corps of the Army of Virginia and fought at the Second Battle of Bull Run. Soon after the battle, the corps was transferred to the Army of the Potomac and reclassified as the I Corps of the Army of the Potomac.

In early September, the I Corps, now under the command of Major General Joseph Hooker, followed Lee through Maryland and fought at South Mountain and Antietam. John Reynolds (who had been elevated to division command of the Reserves) was temporarily detached to train militia troops in his home state of Pennsylvania and did not participate in the Maryland Campaign. At Antietam, the I Corps was the first corps engaged, and suffered enormous losses in the fighting around the cornfield and Dunker Church. Hooker was wounded in the foot during the battle and command of the I Corps devolved on George Meade (the ranking division commander). In October, Reynolds returned and was made commander of the corps.

Having fought three battles in six weeks, the I Corps was severely depleted. An influx of new volunteer regiments (both three year and nine month) arrived to replenish its ranks, and by November it was back up to full strength.

The corps moved southward to fight General Robert E. Lee's army at the Battle of Fredericksburg, commanded by Major General John F. Reynolds, arguably the best Union corps commander in the Eastern Theater. At Fredericksburg, Meade and John Gibbon's divisions fought Stonewall Jackson's corps south of the town while Doubleday's division was held in reserve. The I Corps did not see any significant action in the Chancellorsville Campaign.

In its last major battle, the Battle of Gettysburg, General Reynolds was killed just as the first troops arrived on the field, and command was inherited by Major General Abner Doubleday. Although putting up a ferocious fight, the I Corps was overwhelmed by the Confederate Third Corps (A.P. Hill) and Robert E. Rodes's division of Richard S. Ewell's Second Corps. It was forced to retreat through the town of Gettysburg, taking up defensive positions on Cemetery Hill after the 16th Maine's brave stand of which only 39 soldiers returned. The next day (July 2, 1863), the command was given to Major General John Newton, a division commander from the VI Corps. This was a controversial move that deeply offended the more senior Doubleday. Newton led it through the remainder of the battle, including the defense against Pickett's Charge, and through the Mine Run Campaign that fall.

On March 24, 1864, the Civil War career of the I Corps came to an end as it was disbanded and its depleted units were reorganized into two divisions, which were transferred into the V Corps of the Army of the Potomac.

Command history

* As III Corps, Army of Virginia

References

Eicher, John H., & Eicher, David J.: Civil War High Commands, Stanford University Press, 2001, 
Fox, William F.: Regimental Losses in the American Civil War, Albany Publishing, 1889 (online text of I Corps section)
Wipperman, Darin: First for the Union:  Life and Death in a Civil War Army Corps from Antietam to Gettysburg, Stackpole, 2020

01
Military units and formations established in 1862
1862 establishments in the United States
Military units and formations disestablished in 1864